The Menhirs of Lavajo are a group of menhirs, located in the civil parish of Alcoutim e Pereiro in the municipality of Alcoutim, Portuguese Algarve.

History

These structures are territorial marks or define sacred spaces from the Late Neolithic or Chalcolithic period (constructed sometime between 3500 and 2800 B.C.).

The first excavations in 1998, revealed the existence of not only the large menhir, but fragments of the two small menhirs. These menhirs raised the possibility that the group was an intentional alignment of these structures. One of these structures were eventually stored in the archaeological museum in Alcoutim.

Architecture
A rural group, located on a small  hilltop, between the Lavajo valley and the ravine of the same name. The area is encircled by fence. 

Part of an aligned group of megalithic religious structures. Consists of three carved menhirs, with the largest decorated with carvings and circles. Its carvings combine decoration arranged along a longitudinal groove, with circles and other elements.

References
Notes

Sources
 
 

Buildings and structures completed in the 4th millennium BC
Buildings and structures completed in the 3rd millennium BC
1998 archaeological discoveries
Megalithic monuments in Portugal
Stone Age Europe
Prehistoric art
National monuments in Faro District
Alcoutim
Menhirs
Late Neolithic